Cho Ha-Ri (Hangul: 조해리, Hanja: 趙海利, ; born 29 July 1986) is a short track speed skater who competes for South Korea.  She is the 2011 Overall World Champion.

Career
At the 2010 Winter Olympics, Cho finished 4th in the women's 1000 metres and 5th in the 1500 metres.  Later that same season, she placed third in the standings for the overall title at the 2010 World Short Track Speed Skating Championships, capturing silver in the 1000 m and 3000 m races, and third in the 1500 m.

At the 2011 World Short Track Speed Skating Championships, Cho won the overall World Championship title, winning the 1000 m and 3000 m races, and finished third in the 1500 m race to capture the overall title. In the following week, Cho helped Korea to win the 2011 World Team Championships (last one to be scheduled into foreseeable future) held in Warsaw.She was part of the Short Track Speed Skating team in the '3000m relay' that won a gold medal in the 2014 Winter Olympics.

References

1986 births
Living people
South Korean female short track speed skaters
Olympic short track speed skaters of South Korea
Olympic gold medalists for South Korea
Olympic medalists in short track speed skating
Short track speed skaters at the 2010 Winter Olympics
Short track speed skaters at the 2014 Winter Olympics
Medalists at the 2014 Winter Olympics
Asian Games medalists in short track speed skating
Asian Games gold medalists for South Korea
Asian Games silver medalists for South Korea
Asian Games bronze medalists for South Korea
Short track speed skaters at the 2003 Asian Winter Games
Short track speed skaters at the 2011 Asian Winter Games
Medalists at the 2003 Asian Winter Games
Medalists at the 2011 Asian Winter Games
Medalists at the 2007 Winter Universiade
Universiade medalists in short track speed skating
Universiade silver medalists for South Korea
Competitors at the 2007 Winter Universiade
Sportspeople from Seoul
20th-century South Korean women
21st-century South Korean women